Phạm Gia Khiêm (born 6 August 1944) is a Vietnamese politician who was Deputy Prime Minister of Vietnam from 1997 to 2011 and former Minister of Foreign Affairs (2006-2011). He was previously Minister of Science, Technology and Environment from November 1996 to September 1997, and was born in Hanoi. He was a lecturer at Bắc Thái College of Electrical Engineering from 1968 to 1970, and gained a Ph.D. in Metallurgy in Czechoslovakia in 1975. He is fluent in English, Russian and Czech. 

Khiêm made an official visit to the United States in March 2007, meeting with expatriate Vietnamese and visiting the Consulate General of Vietnam in San Francisco, California. During the visit he stated he would look into the case of imprisoned journalist Nguyễn Vũ Bình following a request from then United States Secretary of State Condoleezza Rice; Bình was pardoned and released on 8 June 2007.

References

External links
 Biography at the Ministry of Foreign Affairs
 Biography at Nikkei 
 Deputy Prime Minister Phạm Gia Khiêm's address to the 63rd session of the United Nations General Assembly, 27 September 2008

1944 births
Living people
People from Hanoi
Government ministers of Vietnam
Foreign ministers of Vietnam
Members of the 10th Politburo of the Communist Party of Vietnam
Members of the 8th Central Committee of the Communist Party of Vietnam
Members of the 9th Central Committee of the Communist Party of Vietnam
Members of the 10th Central Committee of the Communist Party of Vietnam
Deputy Prime Ministers of Vietnam